Prades is a subprefecture of the Pyrénées-Orientales department in the Occitanie region of Southern France. In 2018, the commune had a population of 6,063. Prades is the capital of the historical Conflent comarca. Its inhabitants are called Pradéens and Pradéennes in French and Pradencs and Pradenques in Catalan. It is also the hometown of Jean Castex, who served as Prime Minister of France from 2020 to 2022.

Geography
Prades is located in the canton of Les Pyrénées catalanes and in the arrondissement of Prades, in the Pyrenees Mountains next to the Canigó and Têt River. Its nearby towns include Codalet, Eus, Vinça and Villefranche-de-Conflent.

Politics and administration

Mayors

Twin towns 
Prades is twinned with:
 Ripoll, Catalonia, Spain
 Lousã, Portugal
 Kitzingen, Germany

Population and society

Demography

Events 
The Prades Festival, which specialises in chamber music, was begun in 1950, when eminent musicians were invited to play with Casals to commemorate the bicentenary of the death of Johann Sebastian Bach. This followed a decade during which Casals had declined to play in public because of events in Spain. From the first festival, recordings of performances at Prades were released on the Columbia record label.

The festival moved to Perpignan in 1951, but returned to Prades the following year. It was renamed the Pablo Casals Festival in 1982.

Universitat Catalana d'Estiu
Every summer, since 1968, the Universitat Catalana d'Estiu (Catalan Summer University) is held at Prada de Conflent. It is an academic event which usually lasts ten days, open to everybody, where scholars, artists, and other personalities coming from all over the Catalan Countries lecture and discuss about a variety of topics of general interest.

Notable people
 Wilfred the Hairy (died 13 August 897), 9th-century Count of Urgell, Cerdanya, Barcelona, Girona, Besalú and Ausona – born in Prades
 Francés de Corteta, nobleman and poet
 Pierre Nicolas Camille Jacquelin du Val (1828–1862), entomologist – born in Prades
 Thomas Merton (1915–1968), trappist monk – born in Prades

Prades was also the adopted home of cellist Pablo Casals and grammarian Pompeu Fabra during their exile from the Spanish Civil War. A small museum in Prades commemorates Casals.

See also
Communes of the Pyrénées-Orientales department

References

Communes of Pyrénées-Orientales
Subprefectures in France